David Duke is an American neo-Nazi, antisemitic conspiracy theorist, far-right politician, convicted felon, and former grand wizard of the Knights of the Ku Klux Klan. From 1989 to 1992, he was a member of the Louisiana House of Representatives. He has been a perennial candidate for various offices throughout his life.

Elections in Louisiana

Federal elections

References

Duke, David